Beth may refer to:

Letter and number
Bet (letter), or beth, the second letter of the Semitic abjads (writing systems)
Hebrew word for "house", often used in the name of synagogues and schools (e.g. Beth Israel)

Name
Beth (given name) lists people with the given name Beth
Beth (singer), Elisabeth Rodergas Cols (born 1981)
Evert Willem Beth (1908–1964), Dutch philosopher and logician

Other uses
"Beth" (song), by the band Kiss
List of storms named Beth

See also
Bayt (disambiguation)Bayt/Beit/Beth/Bet (disambiguation), meaning 'house' in various Semitic languages; part of many place-names
Bet (disambiguation)
Elizabeth (disambiguation)